The Future of Islam is a nonfiction book by English poet and author Wilfrid Scawen Blunt. It was originally published in 1882. It explores many aspects of Islamic politics and the Ottoman Empire at that time.

References

External links
Amazon page for "The Future of Islam"
Goodreads page for "The Future of Islam"

Books about Islam and society
1882 books